Rachel Peláez Ellis (born 5 May 1993) is a Cuban international footballer who plays as a midfielder.

External links 
 

1993 births
Living people
Cuban women's footballers
Cuba women's international footballers
Women's association football midfielders
21st-century Cuban women